Giessen is a village in the Dutch province of North Brabant. It is located in the municipality of Altena, about 7 km southeast of Gorinchem.

History 
The village was first mentioned in  1178 as Giscen. It is named after a river, however the etymology is unclear. Giessen developed in the Middle Ages along the Afgedamde Maas.

The Dutch Reformed church dates was built on a terp (artificial living hill). It was constructed in the 14th century. In 1755, the tower collapsed due to frequently flooding. The church was enlarged in 1856.

Giessen was home to 360 people in 1840. Giessen was a separate municipality until 1973, when it became a part of the former municipality of Woudrichem. Giessen nowadays forms a single urban area with Rijswijk.

Sights 
Giessen is part of the New Dutch Water Line. Fort Giessen has been preserved, and was constructed between 1878 and 1881.

In 2013 Giessen Castle was rediscovered in the village. There are no visible traces of this castle, except for a small monument that marks its location.

Notable inhabitants 
 Carola Schouten (born 1977), politician

Gallery

References 

Populated places in North Brabant
Former municipalities of North Brabant
Geography of Altena, North Brabant